The Arizona Coyotes Radio Network is a 10-station network of radio stations in the U.S. state of Arizona. The flagship of the network is KTAR.

Radio Network list of stations

Flagships (3 stations)
620/KTAR: Phoenix
98.7/KMVP-FM: Phoenix (when there is a conflict on KTAR)
92.3/KTAR-FM: Glendale (when there is a conflict on KTAR and KMVP-FM)

Affiliates (7 stations)

600/KVNA: Flagstaff
980/KNTR: Lake Havasu City
1340/KIKO: Miami
1130/KQNA: Prescott Valley
94.3/KDDL: Prescott 
1230/KATO: Safford
780/KAZM: Sedona

References

External links
Station list on the Coyotes' website

Arizona Coyotes